Lompolo Koné (1921 – 1974) was a Burkinabé playwright, editor, and diplomat. He served as Upper Volta's foreign minister from 1961 to 1966.

1921 births
1974 deaths
Foreign ministers of Burkina Faso

References